Naik Parveen is a 2018 Pakistani drama serial directed by Waqar Ahmed  and Asif Younus, produced by Naughty Forty Productions and written by Sadia Akhtar. The drama stars Maria Wasti, Imran Aslam and Fawad Jalal in lead roles, and was first aired 6 February 2018 on Geo Entertainment, where it airs twice a  week on Monday and Tuesday at 9:00pm. It is a story based on double standards in society and social norms.

Some of the episodes, during Ramadan, were split into short 20 min daily-soap type episodes.

Cast
Maria Wasti as Parveen
Parveen Akbar as Shakra
Shahzad Malik as Hanif Sahib
Najia Baig as Zahra
Wahaj Khan as Rashid
Asma Saif as Zahra
Shehryar Zaidi as Riaz Sahib
Sabahat Ali Bukhari as Roshan Ara
Fawad Jalal as Rudab
Imran Aslam as Ruhab
Amna Malik as Aamna
Mahrukh as Shagufta
Zia Gorchani as Sufiyan Sahib
Sarah Ali as Shameen
Asma Siraj as Mishaal
Omi Butt as Hammad
Haleema Ali (child star) as Nimra
Asma Omer Khan as Mishaal

References

Pakistani drama television series
2018 Pakistani television series debuts